General Sir John Stuart Mackenzie Shea,  (17 January 1869 – 1 May 1966) was a British officer in the Indian Army.

Military career

Educated at Sedbergh School and the Royal Military Academy Sandhurst, Shea was commissioned into the Royal Irish Regiment as a second lieutenant in February 1888. He was promoted to lieutenant on 11 February 1890, and the following year transferred to the Indian Army where he was posted to the 15th Bengal Lancers. He saw action with the Chitral Expedition in 1895, and was promoted to captain on 11 February 1899. The Second Boer War started in South Africa later the same year, and Shea was awarded the Distinguished Service Order (DSO) for leading 200 South Australians in a night attack on Commandant Jan Smuts's laager. For his service in the latter parts of the war, he received a brevet promotion to major on 22 August 1902. He became an Instructor at the Staff College, Quetta in 1906.

Shea served in World War I initially as a General Staff Officer first with the British Expeditionary Force and then with 6th Division. He became Commander of 151st Brigade in 1915, General Officer Commanding 30th Division in 1916 and General Officer Commanding 60th (2/2nd London) Division in Palestine in 1917. He commanded the 60th Division at the Battle of Mughar Ridge in November 1917, at the Battle of Jerusalem in December 1917 and at the First Battle of Amman in March 1918.
On 9 December 1917 he received the keys of the city of Jerusalem, an act symbolising its surrender by the mayor Hussein al-Husayni, after many other generals refused to take this responsibility.

After the War he became a Corps Commander in Palestine in 1918, General Officer Commanding 3rd (Indian) Division in 1919 and General Officer Commanding Central Provinces District in India in 1921. He went on to be Adjutant-General, India in 1924 and General Officer Commanding-in-Chief, Eastern Command, India in 1928 before retiring in 1932.

References

|-

|-
 

1869 births
1966 deaths
Academics of the Staff College, Quetta
Knights Grand Cross of the Order of the Bath
Knights Commander of the Order of St Michael and St George
Companions of the Distinguished Service Order
People educated at Sedbergh School
Indian Army cavalry generals of World War I
British military personnel of the Chitral Expedition
Graduates of the Royal Military College, Sandhurst
British Indian Army generals
Canadian military personnel from Newfoundland and Labrador